Matsuoka (written:  or  lit. "pine tree hill") is a Japanese surname.

Matsuoka is the 142nd most common name in Japan as of 2014, belonging to approximately 1 out of 865 people, or 141,900 individuals. It is most prevalent in Osaka, with the highest percentage per capita in Kochi and Kumamoto prefectures.

Notable people with the surname include:

(Names are listed by field, alphabetically by given name in the western convention of given-name, surname for clarity.)

Academics
, Japanese philanthropist and cultural ambassador 
Hiroyuki Matsuoka (born c. 1956), Japanese professor of infection and immunity
, Japanese baron and economics professor
, birth name of Kunio Yanagita, Japanese scholar and folklorist
, Japanese computer scientist
, Japanese naval officer, linguist, and ethnologist.
 Japanese Confucianist and herbalist
Yoko Matsuoka McClain (1924–2011), Japanese-born American professor of language and literature
Yoky Matsuoka (born 1972), American computer scientist

Arts and entertainment
, Japanese musician
, Japanese painter
, Japanese film studio executive
, Japanese film director
, Japanese rakugoka known as Danshi Tatekawa
, Japanese musician
, Japanese mystery writer
, Japanese television executive
Kent Matsuoka (born 1974), American film producer 
, Japanese actress
, Japanese actress and musician
, Japanese actor and musician
, Japanese actress
Mei Matsuoka (born 1981), Japanese-English illustrator and writer
, Japanese musician
Mona Matsuoka (born 1998), American fashion model
, Japanese musician
Takashi Matsuoka (born 1954), American writer
, Japanese voice actress
, Japanese voice actor
, Japanese voice actor
, better known as Aka Plu, Japanese comedian

Politics
, Japanese Bakufu loyalist 
, Japanese wife of Eisaku Satō 
, Japanese politician and labor activist
, Japanese political activist
, Japanese politician
, Japanese politician
, Japanese politician
, Japanese baron and politician
, Japanese diplomat and politician

Sports and martial arts
, Japanese cross-country skier
, Japanese footballer
, Japanese footballer
, Japanese akidoka
, Japanese baseball player
, Japanese sport shooter
, Japanese martial arts master
, Japanese baseball player
, Japanese women's basketball player
, Japanese long-distance runner
, Japanese footballer
, Japanese footballer 
, Japanese tennis player
, Japanese footballer
, Japanese footballer
, Japanese judoka
, Japanese volleyball player

Others
, Japanese Go player
, Japanese Shinto priest 
 Japanese Catholic Bishop
 Japanese guitar maker
 Japanese entrepreneur and philanthropist
, Japanese Zen Buddhist teacher
, Japanese mob boss

Fictional characters
Kenjiro Matsuoka, a character in the video game Killer7
, a character in the manga series Strawberry Marshmallow
, a character in the anime series Free!

References

Japanese-language surnames